Breccia Island is a small low island lying  northwest of the Tiber Rocks in the northern part of Rymill Bay, off the west coast of the Antarctic Peninsula. It was photographed by the Ronne Antarctic Research Expedition (RARE) in November 1947 (trimetrogon air photography), and so named by RARE geologist Robert L. Nichols because the country rock is a plutonic breccia.

See also 
 List of Antarctic and sub-Antarctic islands

References 

Islands of Graham Land
Fallières Coast